The Santa Fe Film Festival is a non-profit organization which presents important world cinema that represents aesthetic, critical, and entertainment standards highlighting New Mexican film. The organization partners with educational groups, schools, and other non-profits to provide a forum for filmmakers, critics, educators, and historians. The award is in the form of a mounted original sculpture. The festival has been listed as one of the top independent film festivals in the United States.

Festival and awards
The festival is generally run between Thanksgiving and Christmas time (late November to early December) in the Santa Fe, New Mexico area and was inaugurated in 1999 but began an institutionalized schedule starting in the year 2000 which sold over 9,000 tickets and passes. The festival was founded by Kurt Young and Joanna England  The awards varied over the years. Initial categories included: Best Short, Best Documentary, Best Feature, Best Native American Film, and Best Latino Film. By 2006, the awards became the Milagro Award (best American independent film), the Independent Spirit Award (Santa Fe Natural Tobacco Independent Spirit Award), and the Audience Award, Honorable Mention (if needed), Creative Spirit Award, and the Lifetime Achievement Award (if warranted).
The major contributors to the event, Robert O'Connor, Ben Mason, Jon Bowman and John Armijo, serve as the board of directors, along with Linda Horn.
Kurt Young was the first director of the festival and appointed Jon Bowman. Jon Bowman was the director of the festival for ten years.

Individuals awarded include:

1999
Best Feature- Cider House Rules

2000
Best Short - This Guy Is Falling (2000) - Michael Horowitz (I); Gareth Smith (I)
Best Documentary - One Day in the Life of Andrei Arsenevich - Chris Marker
Best Feature - Zamani barayé masti asbha (2000) - Bahman Ghobadi
Best Native American Film - Backroads (2000) - Shirley Cheechoo
Best Latino Film - Estorvo (2000) - Ruy Guerra

2001
Best Short - Dragonflies, the Baby Cries (2000) - Jane Gillooly and Gina, an Actress, Age 29 (2001) - Paul Harrill
Best Documentary - Paperboys (2001) - Mike Mills (II)
Best Native American-Themed Film - Christmas in the Clouds (2001) - Kate Montgomery (I)
Best Feature - Atanarjuat: The Fast Runner (2001) - Zacharias Kunuk
Best Latino Film - Y tu mamá también (2001) - Alfonso Cuarón

2002
Best Short - Book of Kings (2002) - Chris Terrio
Best Documentary - Vakvagany (2002) - Benjamin Meade
Best Native American-Themed Film - Lady Warriors (2002) - John C.P. Goheen
Best Feature - Hukkle (2002) - György Pálfi (I)
Best Latino Film - Todas las azafatas van al cielo (2002) - Daniel Burman
Best New Mexico Film - Little Lourdes (2002) - Elisabeth Unna
Milagro Award - Slaughter Rule, The (2002) - Alex Smith (II); Andrew J. Smith
Audience Award - Ruthie and Connie: Every Room in the House (2002) - Deborah Dickson

2003
Creative Spirit Award - Jon E. Edwards Is In Love (2003) - Chris Bradley, Kyle LaBrache
Honorable Mention - Blackwater Elegy (2003) - Joe O'Brien (III); Matthew Porter (I)
Audience Award - Indigo (2003) - Stephen Simon
Best of the Southwest - Jesus Freak (2003) - Morgan Nichols and Movie Farm
Best Short - Simones Labyrinth (2003) - Iván Sáinz-Pardo
Best Short Film - Raven Tales: Raven Steals the Sun (2004) (TV) - Chris Kientz
Best Documentary - Mojados: Through the Night (2004) - Tommy Davis (V)
Best of Festival - Dare mo shiranai (2004) - Hirokazu Koreeda
Creative Spirit Award - Loss of Nameless Things, The (2004) - Bill Rose (I)
Best of the Fest - Depuis qu'Otar est parti... (2003) - Julie Bertucelli
Independent Spirit Award - Sonata (2004) (V) - Boris Undorf
Best Latino Film- Paloma de papel (2003) - Fabrizio Aguilar

2004

 Milagro Award: Best Documentary- Mojados: Through the Night (2004) -Tommy Davis
 Milagro Award: Raven Tales (2004)- Chris Kientz
 Milagro Award: Best of Festival-  Nobody Knows (Dare mo shiranai (original title) (2004)- Hirokazu Koreeda
 Milagro Award: Creative Spirit Award- The Loss of Nameless Things (2004)- Bill Rose
 Independent Spirit Award: Sonata (2004)  -Boris Undorf

2005
Screenwriting - Fall to Grace (2005) - Mari Marchbanks
Best of the Southwest - Self Medicated (2005) - Monty Lapica (director); Tommy Bell (II) (producer)
Best Animation - Souvenir (2004) - Stephen Rose (III)
Creative Spirit Award in Documentary - Balloonhat (2005) - A.G. Vermouth

2006
Milagro Award - Cowboy del Amor (2005) - Michèle Ohayon and English as a Second Language (2005)
Independent Spirit Award - Jam (2006/I) - Craig Serling; Nicole Lonner
Audience Award - Gymnast, The (2006) - Ned Farr
Lifetime Achievement award for Hungarian cinematographer Laszlo Kovacs Kovacs has more than 60 feature films to his credit, including the 1969 biker film Easy Rider, Five Easy Pieces, Paper Moon and Ghostbusters. Actress Ali MacGraw hosted the ceremony.

2007
Luminaria Lifetime Achievement award for National Film Board of Canada First Nations filmmaker Alanis Obomsawin.
Best documentary - The Ballad of Esequiel Hernandez

2008 

 Milagro Award- Best Cinematography- The Objective (2008)- Stephanie Martin
 Independent Spirit Award- Shoot First and Pray You Live (Because Luck Has Nothing to Do with It) (2008)- Lance Doty
 Creative Spirit Award- An Unlikely Weapon (2008) - Susan Morgan Cooper
 Emerging Filmmaker Award- Em (2008)- Tony Barbieri 
 Heineken Red Star Award- A Lonely Place for Dying (2008)- Justin Eugene Evans
 Audience Award- Play the Game- Marc Fienberg
 Indiefests @ SFFF Audience Award- Best Short (2008) - Hell on the Border
 Indiefests @ SFFF Audience Award- Best Documentary- Six Man, Texas (2008) - Alan Barber
 Jury Award- Best Short Film- El taxista (2008)- Luis Robledo

2009 

 Milagro Award: Best documentary- Mythic Journeys- Steven Boe, Whitney Boe
 Milagro Award: Best Indigenous Film - Kissed by Lightning (2009)- Kateri Walker
 Milagro Award: Best Short Doc - Sonabai: Another Way of Seeing (2009)- David Berez
 Milagro Award: Emerging Filmmaker- Char·ac·ter (2009)- Drago Sumonja
 Creative Spirit Award: Earthwork (2009) -Chris Ordal
 Emerging Filmmaker Award: Drago Sumonja
 Audience Award: Earthwork (2009) -Chris Ordal
 Jury Award: Best Dramatic Feature- The Only Good Indian (2009)- Kevin Willmott, Thomas L. Carmody, J.T. O'Neal, Scott Richardson, Greg Hurd, Matt Jacobson, Jeremy Osbern, Dan Wildcat, Wes Studi, Matt Cullen
 Jury Award: Best Documentary Feature- Vivir de pie. Las guerras de Cipriano Mera - Valentí Figueres, Helena Sánchez
 Jury Award: Best Short Film: La niña del desierto- Malachi Rempen
 Festival Prize: Best New Mexico Filmmaker- Becoming Eduardo -Michael Colin (Editor) (Postproduction Supervisor)
 Festival Prize: Best Picture- Taylor's Way - René Brar

2021 

 Jury Award: Best Animated Film - Metro6 -Geoff Hecht 
 Jury Award: Best Director - Ruben Pla (The Horror Crowd- 2020)
 Jury Award: Best Cinematography -Recipiphany - Piero Basso
 Jury Award: Best Film- Motorvation- Angus Benfield (writer)
 Jury Award: Best International Film- Campeón - Oscar Rodríguez Górriz
 Jury Award: Best Story- Black Heart, Red Hands- Russell Southam (producer), Adam Spinks (producer), Owen Elliott (consulting producer)
 Sisters of Cinema: Best Short Film- The Woman Under The Tree
 Sisters of Cinema: Producer- Hung Up - Melissa Jackson
 Best Short Film:  LGBTQ+ - 62-84, I Didn't Copy That, HQ - 62-84 Anlasilmadi Merkez (original title)
 Best of Afro Cinema- Black & White - Edgar Garcia Chavez (director)
 Best of Afro Cinema- White Gold- Luke Bradford, Jackie Sheppard, Luke Walton
 Best Film- The Kennedy Incident-  Mart Sander
 Best Story- Terror Eyes- Delaney Bishop, Felix Brenner
 Best Feature Film- Broken Gaiete- Hafid Abdelmoula
 Best LGBTQ+ Film- Jesse James- Josef Steiff (writer/director)

References

External links
Santa Fe Film Festival website
Santa Fe Film Festival at the Internet Movie Database

Film festivals established in 1999
Culture of Santa Fe, New Mexico
Tourist attractions in Santa Fe, New Mexico
Film festivals in New Mexico